Le Puy is a commune in the department of Doubs in the eastern French region of Bourgogne-Franche-Comté.

Geography
It is close to its intersection with the D336 on the east and the A36 on the west.

Population
The inhabitants of Le Puy are known as Puylots.

Sights
The chapel of Notre-Dame de la Délivrance was erected in 1854 by the parishioners in thanksgiving to Our Lady for being spared from a cholera epidemic. An outdoor mass is celebrated on the Sunday nearest the Feast of the Immaculate Conception, 8 December each year.

Etymology
The village is labeled le Puits (French: the Well) on the Cassini map. The French le Puy usually correlates to the Provençal word Puech (an isolated hill). Here, as the Cassini map shows, it refers to the local wells.

See also
 Communes of the Doubs department

References

External links

All sites are in French, unless otherwise indicated.
 Le Puy on the Institut Géographique National site
 Financial Data for Le Puy from the Ministry of the Economy, Finances and Industry
 Tax information for Le Puy
 My hometown (Monclocher) site(Location of townhall only)
 Le Puy on the intercommunal Web site of the department

Communes of Doubs